The men's triple jump event at the 1974 British Commonwealth Games was held on 31 January and 2 February at the Queen Elizabeth II Park in Christchurch, New Zealand.

Medalists

Results

Qualification
Held on 31 January.

Final
Held on 2 February.

References

Athletics at the 1974 British Commonwealth Games
1974